"Everybody Wants You" is a hit song written and performed by American rock singer and guitarist Billy Squier. It appeared as the opening track of his multi-Platinum 1982 album Emotions in Motion, and was released as the second single (following the title track) from that album, reaching #31 on the Cash Box Top 100 and #32 on the Billboard Hot 100 chart. It became, however, a much bigger hit on AOR (Album Oriented Rock) radio, gridlocking the top spot of Mainstream Rock charts for six weeks straight. The song's music video also remained in heavy rotation for months on MTV.

Details 
The song features three guitars and a bass playing a "hard-rocking and funky" riff, and a "sleekly new wave-oriented production". It became a huge hit on both radio and MTV, topping the Billboard Mainstream Rock Tracks charts for six weeks, from August 28 to October 8, 1982.
It was also on the pop charts, debuting on the Billboard Top 40 on November 27, 1982 and peaking at number 32. It was Squier's third Top-40 song, following "The Stroke" (number 17) and "In the Dark" (number 35).

"Everybody Wants You" is included on Squier's 1995 greatest hits collection 16 Strokes: The Best of Billy Squier.

"Everybody Wants You" was one of the songs Squier has performed live with Ringo Starr & His All-Starr Band; one version appeared on the Ringo Starr & His All Starr Band Live 2006 album, along with Squier's 1984 hit "Rock Me Tonite".

Chart history

Covers
The song has been covered by artists such as the American hard rock bands Puddle of Mudd, Damone
and The Unband, whose version appeared on the soundtrack to the 2000 film Scary Movie.

Canadian indie rock band Tokyo Police Club performed a version of the song in August 2010 for The A.V. Club A.V. Undercover series.

In popular culture
The song was used as The Fabulous Ones' (Steve Keirn and Stan Lane) entrance theme during their time in the Memphis-based Continental Wrestling Association from 1982 to 1985.

The song was used in the episode 13 (title: 'Standards and Practices') of season 1 of the drama The Closer.

In 2004, a mashup of "Everybody Wants You" and "Emerge" by Fischerspooner was included on the Queer Eye soundtrack.

The song is used the first couple seasons of the TV show Burn Notice, including being used in a promotional ad for the second season.

The song is used in the 2012 film Battleship.

See also
List of Billboard Mainstream Rock number-one songs of the 1980s

References 

1982 singles
Billy Squier songs
Songs written by Billy Squier
Song recordings produced by Reinhold Mack
1982 songs
Capitol Records singles